Matt Pizzolo (born on Long Island, New York) is an American film director, screenwriter, producer, bestselling comic book writer, playwright, and entrepreneur, best known for his work as writer of the speculative politics comic books Calexit  and Young Terrorists, creator of the transmedia franchise Godkiller, writer-director of the indie movie Threat, and director of  music videos for Atari Teenage Riot.

He co-founded and runs indie film studio HALO 8 Entertainment with producing partner Brian Giberson and comic book publisher Black Mask Studios with partner Brett Gurewitz and creative director Steve Niles.

In 2012 Pizzolo was selected by Wired as "World's Most Wired Comics Creator" for his work synthesizing genre media with street politics ("anticorporate DIY production") and innovating new storytelling technologies ("engineering the transmedia spine that will take comics into the future").

Pizzolo became involved in political organizing in 2017, leveraging the momentum of his comic book series Calexit. He formed the political action committee "Become The Government" to support first time political candidates in the 2018 Midterm Elections (initially funded by his Calexit royalties), ran interviews with first-time candidates and grassroots organizers in the non-fiction backmatter of Calexit, and hosted Indivisible to run voter registration at his booth on the showfloor of San Diego Comic Con.

Career

Threat

Pizzolo was 19 years old and living out of a backpack in New York City's Lower East Side, and working at Kim's Video and Tower Records when he wrote the screenplay for Threat, a radical, transgressive story of class struggle and youth violence.

He intended to shoot Hi8 footage of the principal characters, and cutting their dialogue and reaction shots against footage stolen from obscure films, creating a unique project built on film sampling (a common practice in the indie rock music of the time). As the project developed, Pizzolo discarded the sampling format and instead directed it on 16mm film as a traditional independent film despite the fact that its massive scope of location and action was quite ambitious for no-budget indies of the time which generally focused on a single-location, talking-heads format.

Threat attracted controversy for allegedly glorifying violence and class conflict. When Threat opened at Montreal's Cinema du Parc, Kevin Laforest of the Montreal Film Journal stated, "Films like La Haine, Menace II Society or Fight Club also portray people raging against the machine, but they ultimately show that violence doesn't solve anything. Whereas Matt Pizzolo's flick openly glorifies murderous revolt, literally telling the audience to go out and beat up random people, just because." When Threat premiered in US theaters, Suicide Girls commented, "Matt Pizzolo shook up Hollywood with his indie movie Threat and the guerrilla tactics he used to produce and distribute it. A defiant and confrontational movie about class war and unbridled youth violence, Threat is not exactly the type of film you might expect to earn its writer-director a multi-picture deal with Sony, but that's exactly what Pizzolo managed to accomplish along with his filmmaking partner Katie Nisa and their Kings Mob multimedia militia."

Threat went on to tour the US and Europe several times. After screenings, Pizzolo and filmmaking partner Katie Nisa would teach DiY Filmmaking Workshops for aspiring guerrilla filmmakers. Over time, the filmmaking workshops became a focus of the events and Pizzolo invited local independent media-makers to teach various DiY-instructional workshops.

DiY-Fest
These workshops developed into DiY-Fest, the "touring carnival of Do-it-Yourself mediamaking" with contributions from notable independent artists including Ian MacKaye, Ani Difranco, Howard Zinn, Jello Biafra, Jim Jarmusch, Jem Cohen, Sarah Jacobson, Abel Ferrara, and many more.

"Rage"
Pizzolo was invited to give a lecture on DiY media at 2600 Magazine's H.O.P.E.: Hackers On Planet Earth conference. He titled the lecture "Open Source Mediamaking" and articulated the need for independent media by contrasting the relatively tepid news coverage of the 1999 WTO protests in Seattle against the provocative and incendiary documentary footage shot independently by activists on the ground inside the protests. The radical band Atari Teenage Riot invited Pizzolo to create a video for their song "Rage" and utilize the documentary footage in the hopes of spreading it to a wider audience. Pizzolo incorporated footage from the WTO protests in Seattle, the World Bank protests in Washington DC, and the May Day protests in Berlin where members of Atari Teenage Riot were arrested (footage was provided by pickAxe Productions, Big Noise Films, Re:Generation TV, and Philipp Virus). The video played numerous festivals including the Chicago Underground Film Festival and was later included in Buddyhead's Punk Is Dead music video compilation DVD.

HALO 8 Entertainment

In 2005, Pizzolo formed HALO 8 Entertainment, a production, distribution, and marketing company devoted to counterculture films, punk rock cinema, and alt-lifestyle videos. Although the company was partly devised as a distribution infrastructure for Kings Mob's productions, HALO-8 quickly grew into a thriving indie studio with various shingles including horror movie/cult film sub-label UnitShifter Films and alt-lifestyle sub-label DiY-Fest Video.

One of the first films Pizzolo championed at HALO-8 was the controversial and embattled Your Mommy Kills Animals, a critically acclaimed documentary about the animal rights movement. Although widely praised for its unbiased approach, the film drew the ire of Washington lobbying firm Center for Consumer Freedom, who waged a costly legal campaign to block release of the film. Despite Amazon.com, Netflix, and numerous other retailers, film festivals, and movie theaters' decision to drop the film when faced with legal threats and intimidation, Pizzolo stood by the film and continued its distribution despite fierce, ongoing opposition.

Godkiller and "Illustrated films"
In February 2009, Pizzolo announced his next film would be an illustrated film called Godkiller: Walk Among Us, adapted from his graphic novel of the same name, which was illustrated by Anna Muckcracker. Set in the future after an economic collapse, a nuclear holy war and an alien invasion, Godkiller: Walk Among Us follows an orphan named Tommy as he searches for a new heart for his ill sister, Lucy. Pizzolo explained the inspiration of the story thus: "I thought it would be fun to design a new mythology for fuck-ups and misfits. My goal with it is to present heroes that don't behave heroically because it's their job to maintain the status quo or because they're bored and want to rescue a princess, they act heroically because they're regular misfits who are trying to do the best they can for each other in an unjust, fucked-up world."

The illustrated film format Pizzolo developed with producer Brian Giberson for Godkiller merges sequential art with 3D CGI, motion graphics and dramatic voice performances in the style of a radio play. 
 	

Godkiller featured performances by Lance Henriksen, Danielle Harris, Justin Pierre (singer of Motion City Soundtrack), Davey Havok (singer of AFI), Nicki Clyne, Bill Moseley, Katie Nisa, Lydia Lunch, and a musical score composed by Alec Empire and Nic Endo of Atari Teenage Riot.

Once released, the first episodic DVD quickly established itself as its distributor's all-time fastest-selling release.

In August 2009, it was announced the Godkiller: Walk Among Us DVDs would include serialized audiobooks of the prequel urban fantasy/speculative fiction novel Godkiller: Silent War. Set in the near future, Godkiller: Silent War tells the story of Joe Junior, a 17-year-old draft-dodger who is recruited by an armed cult of populist assassins and thrust into a secret world of international cabals, alien conspiracies, and the countdown to Armageddon.

In May 2010, the Godkiller: Walk Among Us series of shortform illustrated film was collected into a feature-length film and distributed in theaters. It was distributed day and date with a digital release by Warner Brothers before streaming on Netflix and Hulu.

The comic book sequel Godkiller: Tomorrow's Ashes debuted in January 2012 through a hybrid digital and convention-exclusive release.

Godkiller returned in 2014 as a comic book series published by Black Mask Studios.

In November 2014, it was reported that Godkiller would be rebooted as an animated feature film trilogy directed by Pizzolo.

The Long Knives
During Halo-8's panel at WonderCon in April 2010, Pizzolo announced production of The Long Knives, a comic book illustrated by Ana Ludeshka and animated Giallo film homage to Dario Argento.

Though not an official prequel, Pizzolo has indicated that The Long Knives takes place in a shared universe with Godkiller and deals with several key Godkiller characters during the breakdown of society that precedes Godkiller: Walk Among Us.

The Long Knives comic book series debuted on digital comics platform Graphic.ly in January 2011 and was distributed through a hybrid digital and convention-exclusive release.

Black Mask Studios

In 2012, Pizzolo co-founded the comic book publishing company Black Mask Studios with Brett Gurewitz. The label was formed with Pizzolo serving as president and Steve Niles as creative director. On forming the company, Gurewitz told Wired "Comics and punk have a lot in common, being transgressive art forms with under-appreciated potential for social influence." Focusing on transgressive art and genre stories with a social message, Pizzolo coined the name Black Mask as an homage to the anarchist group Black Mask and the Edgar Allan Poe story The Masque of the Red Death.

Comic Book Writing: Young Terrorists and Calexit
After Black Mask re-released Godkiller in traditional comic book format, Pizzolo wrote the Amazon bestselling graphic novel series Young Terrorists illustrated by Amancay Nahuelpan, which became one of the top selling independent graphic novels of 2015 (#1 Mature Readers, #2 Marketwide) according to Publishers Weekly.

Pizzolo and Nahuelpan followed up Young Terrorists with the acclaimed comic book series Calexit in 2017, which sold out of its initial 25,000 print run within 24 hours and is now in its eighth printing.

On July 7, 2021, Godkiller returned to comic book stores with Godkiller: Tomorrow's Ashes #1. The painted cover by Nen Chang immediately became the publisher's all-time bestseller. With an initial print run over 40,000, it sold out in its first day of release. The publisher rushed a second printing with a new cover by artist Yasmin Flores Montanez.

Other work

Pizzolo organized the political action committee "Become The Government" in 2017 to support first time political candidates in the 2018 Midterm Elections funded by royalties from his comic book Calexit. In the non-fiction section of Calexit, he interviewed midterm candidate Sara Innamorato and her campaign team ahead of her victory in Pennsylvania, as well as journalist David Sirota whose wife Emily Sirota won a House seat in the 2018 midterms, and numerous other activists and organizers.

Pizzolo hosted Indivisible to run voter registration at his booth on the showfloor of San Diego Comic Con in 2018, where he unveiled the charity comic book Calexit: All Systems San Diego (referencing San Diego band Rocket From The Crypt's album) which introduced the new character Emmie-X, a pirate radio DJ in Occupied San Diego.

Indivisible San Diego adopted Emmie-X as the face of their 2018 voter outreach efforts with the "Voting Is My Superpower" campaign. Artist Emily Pearson (The Wilds, Snap Flash Hustle, Bonding) illustrated Emmie-X for the campaign.

Pizzolo and Indivisible also organized a free "Voting Is My Superpower" event during San Diego Comic Con at Comickaze Comics in Liberty Station for locals who were unable to afford Comic Con badges. Indivisible leader Kathy Stadler, ACLU Advocacy Director David Trujillo, and Council on American-Islamic Relations community liaison Yusef Miller joined Pizzolo for a discussion of how dystopian art can help prepare people for crises in real life.

Pizzolo has been announced as producer on the Warner Brothers feature film adaptation of the Black Mask Studios comic book series BLACK, about a world where only black people have super powers, and the PictureStart feature film adaptation of the comic book series 4 Kids Walk Into A Bank, about a 12-year-old girl who enlists her friends to rob a bank in order to prevent her dad and his friends from botching the job themselves and getting thrown back in jail.

During Halo-8's panel at C2E2, it was announced that Pizzolo would collaborate with Tim Seeley on an adaptation of the comic book series Loaded Bible.

During the same panel, Pizzolo unveiled the first concept art for Medusa: Year One, which Pizzolo describes as "A twist on the Medusa origin-story.",

Pizzolo will direct an illustrated film adaptation of the comic book series Hack/Slash.

Pizzolo organized the Occupy Comics project featuring dozens of comics pros including Alan Moore, David Lloyd, Ben Templesmith, Molly Crabapple, J.M. DeMatteis, Charlie Adlard, Steve Niles, Amanda Palmer and Anna Wieszczyk.

In July 2021, it was announced that Pizzolo will write an adult animated series adaptation of the comic book series Faust, a deconstructed superhero comic contemporaneous with Watchmen, Dark Knight Returns and The Crow, for Sony Television. The comic book launched in 1987 and is considered to be "one of the goriest, most NSFW superhero horror comic book series ever published."

Production style
Pizzolo's artistic and entrepreneurial works are reflective of his DIY ethos and belief that a subversive artist can only maintain creative control of a project if he or she also controls the business aspects including production, distribution, and marketing.

In 1998, while working on Threat, he told Style Magazine, "When we were thinking of starting a DiY production company, there were no models on how to do it in independent film. So we looked to musical role-models like the Wu-Tang Clan, the punk Epitaph label, and the hardcore Dischord label. Now we want Kings Mob to be the role model we couldn't find."

Awards
In October 2006, Pizzolo accepted the Grand Prize for Best Feature on behalf of Threat at the Lausanne Underground Film and Music Festival in Lausanne, Switzerland.

In April 2007, Pizzolo was awarded the "First Feature Film - Special Mention" prize on behalf of Threat at the Rome Independent Film Festival in Rome, Italy.

References

External links
 
 

American dramatists and playwrights
Living people
People from Nassau County, New York
Film directors from New York City
American experimental filmmakers
American people of Italian descent
New York University alumni
American comics writers
American writers of Italian descent
Activists from New York City
People from Long Island
Year of birth missing (living people)